Aetokthonotoxin (AETX), colloquially 'eagle toxin', was discovered in 2021 as the cyanobacterial neurotoxin causing vacuolar myelinopathy (VM) in eagles in North America. As the biosynthesis of aetokthonotoxin depends on the availability of bromide in freshwater systems and requires an interplay between the toxin-producing cyanobacterium Aetokthonos hydrillicola and the host plant it epiphytically grows on (most importantly hydrilla), it took > 25 years to discover aetokthonotoxin as the VM-inducing toxin after the disease has first been diagnosed in bald eagles in 1994. The toxin cascades through the food-chain: Among other animals, it affects fish and waterfowl such as coots or ducks which feed on hydrilla colonized with the cyanobacterium. Aetokthonotoxin is transmitted to raptors, such as the bald eagle, that prey on these affected animals. The total synthesis of AETX has been achieved in 2021, the enzymatic functions of the 5 enzymes involved in AETX biosynthesis were described in 2022.

See also
Cyanotoxin

References

Neurotoxins
Cyanotoxins
Bacterial alkaloids
Nitriles
Bromoarenes
Indoles